A flat (short for scenery flat) or coulisse is a flat piece of theatrical scenery which is painted and positioned on stage so as to give the appearance of buildings or other background.

Flats can be soft covered (covered with cloth such as muslin) or hard covered (covered with decorative plywood such as luan). Soft-covered flats have changed little from their origin in the Italian Renaissance. Flats with a frame that places the width of the lumber parallel to the face are called "Broadway" or "stage" flats. Hard-covered flats with a frame that is perpendicular to the paint surface are referred to as "Hollywood" or "studio" flats.

Often affixed to battens flown in from the fly tower or loft for the scenes in which they are used, they may also be stored at the sides of the stage, called wings, and braced to the floor when in use for an entire performance.

Flat construction

Parts of a flat
Rails (or plates) are the top and bottom framing members of a flat.

Stiles (or studs) are the vertical members of the frame.

Toggles are horizontal cross pieces that run between the stiles or studs. The number and placement of toggles depends on the type of flat.

Corner blocks are used to join the corners of a soft-cover flat. They are normally made of  plywood, and are triangles with corners of 45°, 45°, and 90°.

Keystones join the toggles to the stiles of soft-cover flats.

Straps can be used in place of keystones. They are easier to construct than keystones, but not as strong due to their narrower dimension and reduced glue/nailing surface area.

A coffin lock or screws may be used to join securely adjacent flats, or traditionally with a lash line cleat, where cotton sash cord is lashed around cleats installed on the flat's edges. This allows for quick standing and striking of the set.

Styles
Broadway or stage flats are generally constructed of  nominal ( actual) pine boards. The boards are laid out flat on the shop floor, squared, and joined with the keystones and corner blocks. The keystones and corner blocks are inset  from the outside edge, which allows for flats to be hinged or butted together. They are then glued in place, and stapled or screwed down. The flat can then be flipped over and covered with muslin or decorative plywood. Toggles in a Broadway flat are placed on  centers.

Dados can be made using a radial arm saw or table saw, and a dado stack cutter (two outer circular saw blades and one or more "chippers" between them, giving a much wider cut). Setting up for a dado stack is approximately the same as for preparing keystones and cornerblocks, but requires less layout, as the length of stiles, rails and, toggles are equal to the face of your flat.

Hollywood or studio flats can be made in various thicknesses to suit a particular design, but are most often made of  nominal ( actual) pine boards. The boards are laid out on edge on the shop floor, the ends are glued together and stapled or screwed. Keystones and corner blocks are not normally used. The toggles in a Hollywood flat are placed on  centers.

Hollywood flats may receive a muslin skin over the decorative plywood face. The face is covered in a mixture of water and white glue, the muslin is applied and the entire flat is covered with the water/glue mixture again, to shrink and attach the muslin.

References 
 Friedman, Sally (1994). Backstage Handbook: an illustrated almanac of technical information., Broadway Press.

Stage terminology
Scenic design